The Bella Rose Arts Centre is a community-based proscenium theatre performing arts centre located inside of Halifax West High School in the Clayton Park neighbourhood of the Halifax Regional Municipality, Nova Scotia. The 600 seat, professional grade, multi-purpose theatre has the capacity to handle almost any type of event from music and dance shows, to theatrical productions, and conferences. It currently functions primarily as a rental venue.

Foundation

The idea of the theatre was founded during the planning process of the new Halifax West High School after the old Halifax West High School became condemned due to toxic mould contamination in July 2000.

Though the old Halifax West High School did not have a theatre or auditorium—having just a gymnasium with a stage in it—the communities of Clayton Park and surrounding areas fought for a theatre during the planning process of the new school. The Nova Scotia Department of Education would however not fund a theatre seeing it as an unnecessary add-on to an already expensive new High School.

After many hours of planning and community consultation it was decided that if there was going to be a theatre inside of the new Halifax West High School that the money for it would have to come from sources other than the government. The Halifax West Community Theatre Association was then founded to ensure that a theatre would be included in the overall plans for the new Halifax West High School.

The Halifax Regional School Board turned over the old Halifax West High School that was located on Dutch Village Road over to the Halifax Regional Municipality who then demolished the building sold the lot to a local developer for an undisclosed amount. Of that undisclosed amount approximately $300 000 CAD was then donated to the Halifax West Community Theatre Association so that an empty shell could be included in the High School's initial construction that would one day hold the theatre after fundraising was complete.

Fundraising
Once the new Halifax West High School was completed, the Halifax West Community Theatre Association began fundraising for the new theatre calling it Theatre Halifax. The centre remained known as Theatre Halifax until February 12, 2007, when it was announced that Mickey MacDonald, a local entrepreneur and businessman pledged to donate $300 000.00 CAD towards the theatre. The theatre was then renamed the Bella Rose Arts Centre in honour of his mother, Bella MacDonald and his daughter, Bella Rose MacDonald. The Halifax West Theatre Association was also later renamed to the Bella Rose Arts Centre Society to reflect this generous donation.

The theatre's fundraising efforts include; general donations from individuals, corporations and local governments, holding raffles and selling advertising space on tickets, ticket envelopes, and on the centre's website.

The most notable fundraising campaign is the Name-A-Seat campaign which allows anyone to purchase an inscribed plate in one of the theatre's 600 seats.

The Bella Rose Arts Centre Society is a Canadian registered charity.

Construction
The concrete shell that was put in place for the theatre was fairly limited; the original plan for the theatre only included 503 orchestra seats, no balcony, and no catwalks. The Halifax West Community Theatre Association, during the final planning stages, decided to put in an additional 97-seat balcony and two catwalks. This required some slight modifications to the exterior of the theatre shell on the second floor of the high school to add access to these areas.

After most of the fundraising efforts were completed, construction on the theatre started in February 2007 and was completed in June 2007.

Amenities

 The Bella Rose Arts Centre is a proscenium theatre with a stage that has a performance space that is 34 feet wide and 23 feet deep. The stage has a sprung, professional grade dance floor.
 There are 503 seats in the orchestra and 97 seats in the balcony for a total of 600.
 There are 6 accessibility spots available for wheelchair users.

Notable events and performances
 Brooks Diamond Productions - DRUM! (October 2008)
 2008 Halifax Regional Municipality Swearing In Ceremony (November 2008)
 Premier Rodney MacDonald - Ceilidh for Kids (November 2010)
 Ballet Jörgen Canada - Original Dance (April 2009)
 Halifax Theatre for Young People - The Gravesavers (May 2009)
 Halifax West High School - How to Succeed in Business Without Really Trying (May 2009)
 So You Think You Can Dance Canada - Season 3 - Halifax Auditions (March 2010)
 TV with TV's Jonathan Torrens - TV Mystery Shows (April 2010)
 Halifax Theatre for Young People - Merlin (April 2010)
 Halifax West High School - A Chorus Line (May 2010)
 Halifax Boys' Honour Choir with special guests Men of the Deeps - Mining the Memories (March 2011)
 Dr. Horrible's Sing-Along Blog On Stage (May 2011)

Theatres in Nova Scotia
Community theatre
Buildings and structures in Halifax, Nova Scotia
Music venues in Halifax, Nova Scotia